Esmé Kamphuis (born 22 May 1983 in Zwolle) is a former Dutch heptathlete, who has competed as a bobsledder since 2004.  Her best Bobsleigh World Cup finish was second in the two-woman event at Cesana Pariol in the 2010-11 season. She took a bronze medal at the Bobsleigh European Championships in 2011.

Kamphuis also finished tenth in the two-woman event at the 2008 FIBT World Championships in Altenberg. She competed with Tine Veenstra at the 2010 Winter Olympics, where they finished eighth in the two-woman event.

She qualified for the bobsleigh competition at the 2014 Winter Olympics where she narrowly missed out on a medal by finishing fourth - the best ever result by a Dutch bobsleigh team. Subsequently, in July 2014 she announced her retirement from the sport following the retirement of her brakewoman Judith Vis.

References

External links
 

1983 births
Living people
Dutch female bobsledders
Bobsledders at the 2010 Winter Olympics
Bobsledders at the 2014 Winter Olympics
Dutch heptathletes
Olympic bobsledders of the Netherlands
Sportspeople from Zwolle
20th-century Dutch women
21st-century Dutch women